The Bench Lakes are a chain of five small alpine glacial lakes in Custer County, Idaho, United States, located in the Sawtooth Mountains in the Sawtooth National Recreation Area.  A cutoff from Sawtooth National Forest trail 101 along Redfish Lake leads to the Bench Lakes.  The lakes are drained by an unnamed stream that flows into Redfish Lake, Redfish Lake Creek, and eventually the Salmon River.

The Bench Lakes are in the Sawtooth Wilderness, and a wilderness permit can be obtained at a registration box at trailheads or wilderness boundaries.  The uppermost Bench Lake is at the northeastern base of Mount Heyburn.

References

See also

 List of lakes of the Sawtooth Mountains (Idaho)
 Sawtooth National Forest
 Sawtooth National Recreation Area
 Sawtooth Range (Idaho)

Lakes of Idaho
Lakes of Custer County, Idaho
Glacial lakes of the United States
Glacial lakes of the Sawtooth Wilderness